Jonesboro Economical Transit System, better known as JETS, is the public transportation system in Jonesboro, the largest city in northeastern Arkansas. There are three scheduled bus routes and paratransit service is provided for individuals who cannot use the regular fixed-route bus service.

JETS is a member of the Arkansas Transit Association.

Operations
JETS was launched on May 4, 2006, with three buses operating on 3 fixed routes (15,35,55) and 4 paratransit vans. As of 2018, there are five fixed routes, with five buses normally running those routes (17, 27, 37, 43, 53). Hours of operation are from 5:00 am to 7:00 pm on weekdays, with limited Saturday service also available on select routes.

Routes

 17 Central
 27 Downtown West
 37 North
 43 South Central
 53 East

References

External links
 Jonesboro Economical Transportation System
 City of Jonesboro
 Jonesboro Regional Chamber of Commerce

Jonesboro, Arkansas
Jonesboro metropolitan area
Bus transportation in Arkansas
Paratransit services in the United States
Transit agencies in Arkansas